The Malvési uranium processing plant, a uranium refinery and conversion facility, is located in the Malvezy industrial area in the city of Narbonne in the south of France. The plant has an average capacity of about 14,000 tU as uranium tetrafluoride per year, and is projected to increase its capacity up to 21,000 tU per year. Comurhex, a subsidiary of the French nuclear concern Orano, operates the Malvési Facility.

Gallery

See also
 Tricastin Nuclear Power Plant and its Comurhex Uranium hexafluoride conversion facility
 Honeywell Uranium Hexafluoride Processing Facility

Narbonne
Nuclear fuel infrastructure
Uranium
Companies based in Languedoc-Roussillon
Nuclear history of France
Areva